Janet Irvine Buchanan, (born 4 July 1988) popularly known as Janet Evra, is an English-born vocalist, bassist, guitarist, songwriter and bandleader. Evra sings in English, Spanish, Portuguese, and French and performs in  jazz, indie jazz, French jazz, bossa nova, samba, and Latin jazz styles.

Early life 
Janet Irvine was born in Gloucester, England. She grew up in a musical household and learned the piano, cello, and guitar as a child.  

She was a member of Cheltenham indie rock band Knave in 2006, performing on vocals and rhythm guitar.

She received a B.A. from Principia College in Elsah, Illinois, and a M.S. from the University of Michigan School for Environment and Sustainability in Ann Arbor, Michigan.  She then lived in Alton, Illinois and worked in the sustainability field for an environmental non-profit. She then moved to St. Louis, Missouri, where she is currently residing.

Career 
Evra performs at music events and concerts in the US and Europe. She has performed in Sweden, Denmark, Switzerland, and at the 2019 Deva Jazz Festival in Romania and the 2021 Linna Jazz Festival in Finland.

Evra released her debut album Ask Her to Dance in 2018. In 2019 Evra released 'Wish You Were Here', a single, and in 2020 she released singles 'Summer Love Song', 'Floating on Life', and 'I'd Rather Be Lonely With You'.  Evra signed with Lotown Records in 2020. In 2021 Evra released her second album, Janet Evra & Ptah Williams: New Friends, Old Favorites; the album received national jazz radio play in the US.  In 2022 Evra signed with Plum Jazz and released her third album Hello Indie Bossa.  In 2013 Evra released a single "Almost True" featuring Randy Brecker. 

Evra has collaborated with Randy Brecker, Taylor Eigsti, Andrea Motis, Tracy Silverman, Bob Reynolds, Sara Gazarek, Mohini Dey, Severi Pyysalo, Yusa, Jeff Coffin, Roy Wooten, Eric Marienthal, Chad Lefkowitz-Brown, Ptah Williams, and Diego Figueiredo among other musicians.  Evra was a 2019-2020 Artist in Residence at the Kranzberg Arts Foundation in St. Louis, USA. She is the co-creator of St. Louis Music Box, a social media music video series.

Evra also leads the musical group The Bon Bon Plot performing French jazz music.

Personal life
Evra is married to Will Buchanan, a guitarist and producer. The two regularly perform together.

References

1988 births
Living people
English jazz musicians
People from Gloucester
English women singer-songwriters
Principia College alumni
Musicians from St. Louis
People from Alton, Illinois
Women jazz singers
Jazz double-bassists